Kevin Smith was a U.S. soccer player who earned one cap with the U.S. national team in 1993.  He played professionally for two years then entered coaching.  He is currently the head coach of the Orange Coast College women’s soccer team.

Club career
Smith attended UC Irvine where he played on the men’s soccer team from 1989 to 1992.  He ranks third on the school’s career points list with 68.  In 1993, Smith signed with the East Los Angeles Cobras of the USISL.  In 1993, he moved to Bournemouth F.C. of the Wessex League.  He was back in the United States in 1994 playing for the Los Angeles Salsa in the American Professional Soccer League.

National team
Smith earned his one cap with the U.S. national team in an 8-1 win over the Cayman Islands on November 14, 1993.  He came on for Mike Sorber at halftime.

Coaching
Smith has spent most of his life as a teacher.  Even while in college, he worked as a substitute teacher at Fountain Valley High School, a position he held until 1997.  In 1991, he became the head coach of the boys’ soccer team.  From 1992 to 1993, he worked as a coach in the Olympic Development Program.  In 1993, he was an assistant at UC Irvine.  In 1998, Smith moved from Fountain Valley to Cypress High School where he held a position as a full-time teacher and head coach of the boys soccer team.  In 2006, he became the head coach of the Orange Coast College women’s soccer team.

References

External links
 Orange Coast College coaching profile

American soccer coaches
American expatriate soccer players
American Professional Soccer League players
East Los Angeles Cobras players
Los Angeles Salsa players
Monterrey La Raza players
UC Irvine Anteaters men's soccer players
United States men's international soccer players
USISL players
Living people
Bournemouth F.C. players
American soccer players
Association football midfielders
Expatriate footballers in England
American expatriate sportspeople in England
Year of birth missing (living people)